e.l.f. Cosmetics is an American cosmetics brand based in Oakland, California. It was founded by Joseph Shamah and Scott Vincent Borba in 2004. Items include bath and skin-care products, mineral-based makeup, professional tools, eyeliners, lipstick, glosses, blushes, bronzers, brushes, and mascara, among others.

According to the company, its products are 100% "cruelty-free", and it supports PETA's no fur campaign. e.l.f. Cosmetics' products have been reviewed in Glamour, Allure, Self, InStyle, and Good Housekeeping, and are sold in 17 countries, and in several stores including Target, Kmart, Dollar General, and Walmart. Over half the company's sales come from its website, which doubles as a social networking site with over two million members.

History and operations
e.l.f. (short for EyesLipsFace) Cosmetics was founded by Joseph Shamah and Scott Vincent Borba in June 2004, with the assistance of Shamah's father, Alan. The duo originally met at a party in 2002; Shamah was a 23-year-old New York University business student. Borba was a 31-year-old Los Angeles beauty-industry veteran, responsible for previously launching brands such as Hard Candy cosmetics. Both were enthusiastic about an inexpensive, high-quality cosmetics line for women and decided to form a company together. A few days after the party, they sat down to brainstorm, and a business plan was created within months. Borba claims the idea originated from seeing women with expensive cars such as BMWs and Mercedes-Benzes buying bargain-price cosmetics at 99-cent stores in Los Angeles.

On February 3, 2014, TPG Growth bought a majority stake in e.l.f. Cosmetics. Joey Shamah was replaced by Tarang P. Amin, who "has been appointed president, chief executive officer and director of e.l.f. Cosmetics."

Products
The company started with only 13 makeup products, but has since developed more than 300 products that include bath products, skin-care products, mineral-based makeup, professional tools, eyeliners, lipstick, glosses, blushes, bronzers, brushes, mascara, and many more. Most items cost $3. The variety of e.l.f. products allows the company to target a demographic with a broad age range, from teenagers to women in their 40s and 50s.

The company carries different product lines, which include e.l.f. Studio, e.l.f. Minerals, and e.l.f. Essentials. There used to be e.l.f. Bath & Body, which included moisturizers, cleanser, and fragrances. They have now stopped making those products.
e.l.f. Studio – makeup line includes professional makeup for professional makeup artists and consumers.
e.l.f. Minerals – consists of makeup made out of natural minerals.
e.l.f. Essentials – includes "every-day" makeup supplies at lower prices, in an effort to be affordable.

Sales

Retail
e.l.f. Cosmetics is currently available in 18 countries including the United States, Canada, Australia, the United Kingdom,   Saudi Arabia, France, Colombia, and Spain. Products can be purchased at regional drug chains across the United States and Canada. e.l.f products are most commonly found in Target. In March 2010, e.l.f.'s $1 and Studio line of products were placed in over 700 Target stores, with most individual items prices at $1 and $3. Another Target expansion to include most outlets happened in March 2011. Other stores include Kmart, Dollar General, and Walmart. e.l.f. is also sold at various supermarkets and women's apparel discount retailers, often in four-tiered spinners or "fish bowls" in impulse-buy sections.

Website

History
In 2004, the company was having only partial success stocking its products in retail stores, including dollar stores. Glamour magazine wanted to feature an e.l.f. product but told the company they couldn't unless the product was nationally available for their 2 million-person readership base. e.l.f. Cosmetics at that point had a website intended as a product showcase, and that year it relaunched the site as an e-commerce site, quickly shipping out thousands of orders. Since the premiere of the new site, e.l.f. products have been featured in Glamour over seven times. The website is now the brand's primary sales vehicle and accounted for approximately 50% of all sales in 2008.

Features
In June 2007, e.l.f. launched a beauty blog and advice column that touts products (not only e.l.f.) and talks about celebrity sightings. Since then, the length of customer visits to the website has tripled. All product pages on the site host a "chat now" button that lets customers connect directly with one of the company's in-house professional makeup artists. The site hosts a "virtual makeover lab", where customers can digitally test products on models or their own photos. Customers can create a personal profile, publish and comment on blogs, converse with other customers, and access a beauty encyclopedia. They can also create a "beauty profile" and are recommended e.l.f. products according to their skin type, hair and eye colors, and typical beauty regimen. Also included is the option to create a wish-list that connects to Facebook, or view educational web videos on makeup techniques and styles.
The website currently includes over 2 million members.

Promotions
In 2007, the company began to invest heavily in email marketing, and its weekly email campaigns are considered by eCommerce-Guide to be the company's strongest promotion. The company offers a near-constant supply of promotions to its customers, largely through its website. Subscribers on the mailing list can earn points or gift certificates for making web referrals that turn into sales transactions. Shamah claimed that as of September 2009, more than 500,000 friend referrals had come back to make a purchase.

It also frequently hosts online events, and since 2010 has asked customers of all ages and ethnicities to submit to a casting resource to select a yearly model representative for the brand. Four selected individuals are brought to New York City to receive makeovers from Achelle Dunaway, e.l.f.'s Creative Director and lead makeup artist, as well as participate in a photo shoot. There are various cash prizes for nominees, and the winner is dubbed "face of e.l.f."

Media presence
e.l.f. products have been favorably reviewed in dozens of major magazines, including Glamour, Allure, Self, InStyle, and Good Housekeeping. A segment on e.l.f. premiered on the Style Network as well. The business has been profiled by publications such as Entrepreneur, CNN, Retail Merchandiser, Information Week, and The Wall Street Journal. In December 2010, the e.l.f. product '100-Piece Endless Eyes Pro Eyeshadow Palette' was featured in "The O List: Holiday Edition" ("Oprah's Favorite Things") in Oprah Winfrey's O magazine. The magazine stated the set included "almost every color imaginable," and the product quickly sold entirely out of stock. In January 2011, e.l.f. reintroduced the product at half price, or $10.

Campaigns

Breast cancer funds
During October 2004, just months after its founding, e.l.f. donated 20% of the proceeds from its 'Shimmering Facial Whip' to Win Against Breast Cancer's research and facilities. It also provided "Color Therapy Care Packages" to breast cancer patients in inner-city hospitals in Los Angeles.

PETA
The brand only uses products that are cruelty-free. In 2007, it was announced that e.l.f. was selling tweezers in a faux leather case that read "e.l.f. Professional Supports PETA in the Fur Free Campaign. 50% of the proceeds from sales of these tweezers go straight to PETA!" CEO Joseph Shamah later earned PETA's "Trail-Blazer Award", given for "compassion and commitment to never testing on animals."

2011 Japan earthquake and tsunami
e.l.f. Cosmetics announced the "Mi & You Can Make a Difference" campaign days after the 2011 Tōhoku earthquake and tsunami disaster, which helped fund relief efforts. The program donated 5% of all online purchases to the Red Cross for Japan's crisis recovery initiative.

References

Further reading
 Entrepreneur - E.L.F. challenging industry standard of costly cosmetics (January 2005)
 CNN - A pretty face That Won't Cost an Arm or Leg (January 2006)
 Retail Merchandiser - E.L.F. Cosmetics? Covered (July 2008)
 PETA - Bargain Beauty Essentials Full of Cheap Thrills (October 2010)
 The Wall Street Journal - It's Just Lip Gloss, Mom (February 2011)

Companies based in New York City
Cosmetics brands
Cosmetics companies of the United States
Personal care brands
Companies listed on the New York Stock Exchange